(born 22 December 1958 in Kitakami) is a former Japanese rugby union player who played mainly as Number 8.

Biography
After graduating from Kurosawajiri High School of Iwate, Chida started to play for Nippon Steel Kamaishi. He played as lock while representing Kamaishi and Japan. During the 1983 Japan tour of Wales, Chida played as flanker in order to enlarge the third row. Later, he played as flanker and as number 8 for Japan and mainly played as number 8 for Kamaishi. In 1985, during the Japanese championship against Doshisha, Chida received the ball, leaving Doshisha's defense and went down the goal post. While combining power and speed, he is not a rushing type, but a clever forward that accurately judges pass and dense formation according to circumstances, He was active as a mainstay of Nippon Steel Kamaishi's seventh consecutive victory of the Rugby Japanese Championship  and also served as a forward for the contemporaneous rugby Japanese national team.

International career
His debut for Japan was against New Zealand Universities, at Tokyo, on 30 March 1980. During the match against Wales in 1983, Chida rushed 20 metres from a scrum to score a try late in the second half in the Wales match. He was also a member of the 1987 Rugby World Cup roster, where he played two matches, with the pool match against England at Sydney being his last for Japan.

Personal life
Currently, he works as sales manager for Nippon Steel Engineering Morioka  as well as advisor for club team Blaze Lager from Kitakami. He is also teaching at the Kitakami Municipal South Junior High School and Kitakami Rugby School.
According to Number (22 January 2010), former prop Jiro Ishiyama, who was a teammate in Kamaishi and in the Japan national team stated "Although Hayashi (Toshiyuki) and Oyagi (Atsushi) are never weak, nevertheless, it was Chida who gave the most power required to the scrum."

Notes

External links

1958 births
Living people
People from Iwate Prefecture
Japanese rugby union players
Rugby union locks
Rugby union number eights
Rugby union flankers
Japan international rugby union players
Kamaishi Seawaves players